Aparecida d'Oeste is a Brazilian municipality of the state of São Paulo. The population is 4,158 (2020 est.) in an area of 179 km2.

References

Municipalities in São Paulo (state)